The Lycée Pasteur (French: Lycée Pasteur de Neuilly-sur-Seine) is a French state-run secondary school in Neuilly-sur-Seine, on the outskirts of Paris. It accepts students from collège (the first four years of secondary education in France) through to classes préparatoires (classes to prepare students for entrance to the elite Grandes écoles). Built in the grounds of the former chateau de Neuilly, the lycée is named in honour of Louis Pasteur. 

It was originally planned to open in October 1914 but with the advent of the First World War the building was instead used as a military hospital by American Field Services and not inaugurated until October 1923. 
It was used as the location for the film, Neuilly sa mère !

Notable people

Former teachers
 Fernand Braudel (history)
 Daniel-Rops (history)
 François-Bernard Mâche (literature)
 Émile Moselly (literature)
 Jean-Paul Sartre (philosophy)

Former students

 Jean-Louis Aubert (songwriter, performer)
 Michel Blanc (actor and director)
 Jean-Yves Bosseur (composer)
 Jean-Luc Brylinski (mathematician)
 Gabriel Brunet de Sairigné (soldier)
 Barbara Cassin (philosopher)
 Christian Clavier (actor)
 Jacques Decour (writer and resistant)
 Jean-François Deniau (politician and writer)
 Renaud Donnedieu de Vabres (politician)
 François Hollande (politician, President of the French Republic)
 Gérard Jugnot (actor, scriptwriter)
 Bernard-Henri Lévy (writer and filmmaker)
 Thierry Lhermitte (actor)
 Chris Marker (filmmaker, writer, photographer)
 André Santini (lawyer and politician)
 Jean Sarkozy (son of Nicolas Sarkozy)
 Christian Sautter (politician)
 Henri Troyat (writer)
 Dimitri Obolensky (Historian)

 Lucas Bravo (actor)

Notes and sources
Notes

Sources

 This page is translated and condensed from its French equivalent.

External links 

  Official site
  Site of the Association des Anciens Élèves du Lycée Pasteur

Pasteur
Educational institutions established in 1923
Neuilly-sur-Seine
1923 establishments in France